Raffaella is an Italian female name taken from the male name Rafael, meaning "god has healed".

People
Raffaella Baracchi, (born 1964), retired Italian actress
Raffaella Barker (born 1964), English author
Raffaella Brutto (born 1988), Italian snowboarder
Raffaella Calloni (born 1983), Italian volleyball player
Raffaella Camet Bertello (born 1992), Peruvian volleyball player
Raffaella Carrà (1943–2021), Italian TV hostess, singer and actress
Raffaella De Laurentiis (born 1954), Italian film producer
Raffaella Fico (born 1988), Italian showgirl, singer and model
Raffaella Imbriani (born 1973), German judoka
Raffaella Modugno (born 1988), Italian model
Raffaella Reggi (born 1965), Italian former professional tennis player

Italian feminine given names